Woleai, also known as Oleai, is a coral atoll of twenty-two islands in the western Caroline Islands in the Pacific Ocean, and forms a legislative district in the Yap State in the Federated States of Micronesia and is located approximately  west-northwest of Ifalik and  northeast of Eauripik. Woleai is also the name of the largest of the islets constituting the atoll, lying to the northeast.

The population of the atoll was 1,081 in 2000, on an area of 4.5 km2.

Geography
The northern and eastern rims have several relatively large islets. The western lagoon is deeper and larger than its eastern counterpart. Both components are part of the same seamount. The total land area for both components combined is only .

History
The Austronesian ancestors of the Micronesians who make up the indigenous population of the Caroline Islands arrived in the islands . Woleai subsequently became culturally unique among the Caroline Islands because of a script in use among some speakers of the Woleaian language prior to 1913. Woleai was among islands to the southeast of Yap that became tributaries of the Yapese Empire from about 1500 CE.

Woleai came under the control of the Spanish Empire in 1686, governed along with the rest of the Caroline Islands as part of the Spanish East Indies. Spain sold the islands to the German Empire in 1899. In 1914, in the early weeks of World War I, the Empire of Japan seized German possessions in the Pacific, including Woleai. Assigned a League of Nations mandate to administer the islands after the war in accordance with the Treaty of Versailles of 1919, Japan subsequently administered Woleai under the South Seas Mandate.

In 1944, as Allied forces closed in on the Mariana Islands during World War II, a contingent of 6,426 troops from the Imperial Japanese Army's 50th Independent Mixed Brigade and the Imperial Japanese Navy's 44th Base Guard Unit and 216th Base Construction Unit heavily fortified Woleai. They completely leveled Wolfe Islet and made into an airfield with a single  runway and  taxiway. They also constructed a seaplane anchorage off the southwest corner of Woleai Islet. Allied aircraft bombed the atoll and its military facilities on numerous occasions until the middle of 1945, driving its defenders underground and isolating them from supplies or reinforcements. By the surrender of Japan on September 2, 1945, only 1,650 survivors remained of the initial 6,426-strong Japanese garrison, the rest having perished largely because of starvation and disease rather than in Allied air raids. The United States Navy destroyer escort  picked up the surviving Japanese on September 17, 1945.

Following World War II, the atoll came under the control of the United States. The United States administered Woleai as part of the Trust Territory of the Pacific Islands, a United Nations trust territory, from 1947 until 1979, when Woleai became part of the independent Federated States of Micronesia.

Education
Public schools:
 Woleai High School

Transportation

The  runway has not been maintained since 1992, and the airfield has closed due to severe deterioration of the runway and the government's decision not to perform repairs. The runway is now covered with vegetation. Before the airfield closed, Caroline Islands Air provided chartered flights to it. The runway was built by the Empire of Japan during World War II. After the war it was shortly US Naval Base Woleai, Fleet Post Office #3246.

See also
US Naval Base Carolines

References
 Columbia Gazetteer of the World. Vol. 1, p. 900
 Skog, Captain Peter (2019). A Unique Live at Sea. Bloomington, IN: AuthorHouse UK. .

External links

Pacific Wrecks
Woleai Atoll Surrender
V6T Amateur Radio Woleai

Islands of Yap
Municipalities of Yap
Atolls of the Federated States of Micronesia